Rachael Kohn  (born 1953) is a Canadian-born Australian author and broadcaster who from July 1992 to December 2018 produced and presented programs on religion and spirituality for ABC Radio National, including The Religion Report, Religion Today, The Ark and, principally, The Spirit of Things from 1997 to December 2018. Kohn retired from the ABC in December 2018.

Kohn has also produced many documentary features and New York Festival World Gold Medal award-winning features for Encounter, such as "In God We Trust: Civil and Uncivil Religion in America" (1999), "Coffee, Sex and Other Addictions: Health fads of the 19th Century" (2002) and, for The Spirit of Things, "The Monk and the Modern Girl" (2003). She has also produced and presented the ABC TV documentaries The Dead Sea Scrolls (2000) Buddhism East and West (2001) and Paws for Thought on animals and spirituality for Compass.

Kohn is a frequent speaker on religion and spirituality in Australia. She is the author of The New Believers: Re-imagining God (HarperCollins 2003) and Curious Obsessions in the History of Science and Spirituality (ABC Books, now HarperCollins 2007, revised and updated with ATF Press, 2020).

Life and career
Kohn was born in Canada in 1953 and has two sisters residing in Toronto. Her father escaped from Bratislava, Czechoslovakia, in May 1940 on the boat Pentcho, which broke up and was marooned on Kamilanisi in the Aegean. He was interned by the Italians on Rhodes and then in southern Italy at the Ferramonti di Tarsia camp which was liberated by the British, after which he trained with the British Army, entered Normandy, then returned to Czechoslovakia after the war; her mother lived in Czechoslovakia until the occupation by the Soviet Union in 1949. They settled in Israel in 1949 but moved to Canada in 1952, the year before she was born.

Kohn was awarded a Diploma in Social Work from Ryerson Polytechnical Institute in Toronto, Ontario, then achieved an Hon.B.A. in Sociology and Religion at Concordia University in Montreal, Quebec. Kohn then earned an M.A. (Rabbinic Thought and the New Testament) in 1977 and a Ph.D. (Sociology and History of Religion) in Religious Studies from McMaster University in Hamilton, Ontario in 1985. For both degrees she also studied Buddhism.

Kohn was a TA in religious studies at McMaster University and at Lancaster University in Lancaster, England, where she was Leverhulme Post-Doctoral Fellow in Religious Studies. She taught Religious Studies at the University of Waterloo in Waterloo, Ontario, and then at the University of Sydney (1988–1992). She moved to Australia in 1987 and married Thomas A E Breen in 1989. She joined the Australian Broadcasting Corporation (ABC) in 1992.

Publications
In addition to her books, The New Believers: Re-imagining God (HarperCollins 2004) and Curious Obsessions in the History of Science and Spirituality (ABC Books, now HarperCollins 2007, and Revised Updated with ATF Press, 2020), Kohn has published numerous articles, chapters, and essays in books, journals and newspapers and on the ABC Religion and Ethics website.

Some of these include 'Faith in a "Post Secular" Society' in Meanjin (Vol 65, No 4, 2006); 'Telling Tales of Women' in Lindsay and Scarfe, editors, Preachers, Prophets and Heretics (UNSW Press 2012); 'Saints and Saintliness in Judaism' in Alan Cadwallader, editor, In the Land of Larks and Heroes: Australian Reflections on Saint Mary MacKillop (ATF Press 2010); 'Jewish Thought and the Theory of Evolution' in Jacques Arnould OP, editor, Darwin on Evolution (ATF Press 2010) and 'Jews and Violence' in W Emilsen and J Squires, editors, Validating Violence, Violating Faith? (ATF Press 2007); 'The Ageing Spirit' in Elizabeth MacKinlay, editor, Ageing and Spirituality Across Faiths and Cultures (Jessica Kingsley Publishers, UK 2010), as well as "Is Jewish Thought Unique" in the Australian Journal of Jewish Studies 2010 and 'Encountering God Through Jewish Eyes' in Nigel Leaves (editor) Encountering God, Face to Face with the Divine (MorningStar Publications 2014), 'Self Religions' in Alan Black, editor, Religion in Australia, Sociological Perspectives (Allen & Unwin 1991); 'Cults and the New Age in Australia' in Gary Bouma, editor, Many Religions, all Australian, (CRA 1996); 'Sects, Cults, Democracy and the Law' in A Sharma, editor, The Sum of Our Choices, Essays in Honour of Eric J Sharpe, (Scholars Press 1996), and numerous articles on Jewish-Christian relations, e.g., 'The Catholic and Anglican Church Press of New South Wales and the Jews, 1933-45' in Paul Bartrop, editor, False Havens: The British Empire and the Holocaust, (University Press of America 1995); 'Ethnic Judaism and the Messianic Movement' in The Jewish Journal of Sociology, (Vol. XXIX/2 Dec. 1987) and 'Learning from History: Pre-War Germany and Now' Council of Christians and Jews (Vic) 2007.

Kohn was the editor of the Australian Journal of Jewish Studies in the 1990s. She is the Guest Editor for Fear and Faith, a special edition of the Bonhoeffer Legacy: an International Journal (ATF Press) 2021.

Awards and citations

On 31 December 1999, Kohn was one of 101 Australians, including Prime Minister John Howard, artists Ken Done, John Olsen and Margaret Olley, vice chancellor UNSW John Yu, actors David Wenham and Marina Prior, chosen to represent "the faces of a century" photographed on the front cover of The Australian national newspaper.

In 2005, the University of New South Wales awarded Kohn a Doctor of Letters degree honoris causa for "her eminent contribution to society" in the field of promoting religious understanding across faiths. In the 2019 Queen's Birthday Honours, Kohn was appointed an Officer of the Order of Australia (AO) for "distinguished service to the broadcast media, particularly radio, as a creator, producer and presenter, and to Jewish studies".

Kohn was elected a fellow of the Royal Society of New South Wales in 2019.

References

External links
 Biography at publisher Harper Collins
 Speaker profile, Spirituality and Health Conference 2007
 Speaker Profile, National Gallery of Victoria Messianism
 Speaker at Women And the Australian Church Conference
 
 
 
 
 

1953 births
Living people
Australian writers
Australian broadcasters
Officers of the Order of Australia
Fellows of the Royal Society of New South Wales